Allahabad-e Chah Rigan (also romanized as Allahābād-e Chāh Rīgān) is a village in Chahdegal Rural District, Negin Kavir District, Fahraj County, Kerman Province, Iran. At the 2006 census, its population was 57, in 15 families.

References 

Populated places in Fahraj County